Huntsville Speedway is a quarter-mile (.402 km) oval race track in Huntsville, Alabama. It opened in 1959 as a dirt track, and was paved in 1962. It held one NASCAR Grand National Series event in 1962, won by Richard Petty. Today the track hosts weekly racing with a variety of stock car and modified classes.  It shut down early in 2013 and has reopened on April 2, 2016. It is hosted for race events for other racing types.

The track also hosted one NASCAR Southeast Series event in 2003 and was won by Shane Sieg.

NASCAR Grand National results

References

External links

 Official website
Huntsville Speedway race results at Racing-Reference

NASCAR tracks
ARCA Menards Series tracks
Motorsport venues in Alabama
Sports venues in Huntsville, Alabama